Plavaie is a Moldovan variety of white grape. This variety was popular in the 19th century and at the beginning of the 20th century. Now is rarely cultivated.

See also
Moldovan wine

References

White wine grape varieties
Moldovan wine